AEK Karava-Lampousa is a professional volleyball team based in Karavas, Cyprus. The club has been a refugee club since the 1974 Turkish invasion of Cyprus, when Turkey occupied the northern part of the island. The club is temporarily based in Limassol.

Football

Before 1974 it had a football team. After 1974 the football team merged with PAEK to form PAEEK.

Honours
Cypriot Championships
Winner (1): 2011/12
Cyprus Cup:
Winner (3): 2009/10, 2012/13, 2014/15
Cyprus Super Cup:
Winner (2): 2010, 2012

Volleyball clubs in Cyprus
1957 establishments in Cyprus
Association football clubs established in 1957
Association football clubs disestablished in 1974